Yale Cellos is an ensemble at the Yale School of Music consisting of the School of Music's cello studio--roughly 15 cellists. The group was founded by the famed cello teacher Aldo Parisot, the former professor of cello at the School of Music for sixty years. Currently, the cellists study with Paul Watkins. Since its formation in 1983 the group has produced several CDs, one of which earned a Grammy nomination.

Notable Members/Alumni 
Inbal Segev
Shauna Rolston
Jian Wang (cellist)
Tanya Anisimova
Jesús Castro-Balbi
Johann Sebastian Paetsch
Bion Tsang
Maya Beiser
Matt Brubeck
Agnès Vesterman
Bejun Mehta
Christopher Adkins
Ole Akahoshi
Patrick Jee
Yves Dharamraj
Mihai Marica

American cellists
American classical music groups
Yale School of Music
Yale University musical groups